Pholidotrope is a genus of mostly small deep water sea snails, marine gastropod mollusks in the family Chilodontaidae.

Species
Species within the genus Pholidotrope include:
 Pholidotrope asteroeides Vilvens, 2017
 Pholidotrope choiseulensis Vilvens, 2017
 Pholidotrope gloriosa Herbert, 2012

References

External links
 Herbert, D. G. (2012). A Revision of the Chilodontidae (Gastropoda: Vetigastropoda: Seguenzioidea) of Southern Africa and the South-Western Indian Ocean. African Invertebrates. 53(2): 381-502
 To World Register of Marine Species

 
Chilodontaidae
Monotypic gastropod genera